Samuel D. Wright was born on February 13, 1925, to Daisy Belle Chisholm-Wright and Carson James Wright in Brooklyn, NY

Sam, as he was affectionately called by family members and friends, was a graduate of the New York public school system. He received his B.S. degree from Suffold University, Boston, MA., in 1950. He earned a Bachelor of Art
Degrees from Hunter College and New York University in 1957. He was a 1962 graduate of Brooklyn Law School.
Sam served his country honorably during World War IIin the U.S. Air Force. After his service tenure, he became an investigator in The Brooklyn Corporation Counsel's Office, and in 1962, he was appointed junior attorney in The City Of New York Law Department. He was elected to The New York State Assembly in 1966 and served until 1973 when he was elected to the New York Council, serving from 1974 to 1978. He was first chairman of the Black and Puerto Rican Caucus for the State of New York. Sam helped to create and manage the local #26 school board of Brooklyn, New York. He was originator of the Decentralization Bill passed by Congress. He was instrumental in the election for former Governor of New York Hugh Carey, Senator Patrick Monihan and Congressman Charles Rangel, as well as former President Jimmy Carter. After retiring from public life, he served as national labor director for the NAACP from 1984 to 1992. For some thirty-two years Sam was a faithful member of Concord Baptist Church Of Christ, where he served as church attorney. After retirement in 1994 and moving to Hilton Head he became a member of The Mount Calvary Missionary Baptist Church.

Sam was joined in holy matrimony to the former Josephine Hairs on May 4, 1947. To this union were born five sons and two daughters.

He died of Parkinson's disease on January 20, 1998, in Hilton Head Island, South Carolina, at age 72.

References

1925 births
1998 deaths
20th-century American politicians
Democratic Party members of the New York State Assembly
New York City Council members
Politicians from Brooklyn